Addictive refers to things characterized by, or causing, addiction.

Addictive may also refer to:

 Addictive (Australian band), an Australian thrash metal band
 Addictive (English band), a pop/dance duo
 "Addictive" (song), a 2002 song by Truth Hurts
 Addictive TV, a UK media production company
 Addictiv (born 1984), Canadian singer

See also
 Addicted (disambiguation)
 Addiction (disambiguation)
 Addict (soundtrack), a soundtrack album from the anime series FLCL
 "Addicts" (Undeclared episode), a 2001 episode of American sitcom Undeclared